Kenneth Alan Florian (born May 26, 1976) is an American retired mixed martial artist and commentator who formerly competed in the Ultimate Fighting Championship (UFC). He formerly served as an analyst for UFC on Fox from 2011–2018, and he also worked as a color commentator on the robot combat television series BattleBots and color commentator for UFC Fight Night. He is currently signed to the Professional Fighters League (PFL) as a commentator.

Florian has a background in Brazilian Jiu-Jitsu and Muay Thai. He is known for his cerebral approach to the sport based on his meticulous game plans. Florian is recognized for his tendency to finish his opponents, having earned stoppages in twelve of his fourteen career victories. He is also one of only two fighters in history to compete in four different weight classes in the UFC: Middleweight, Welterweight, Lightweight and Featherweight, the other being Diego Sanchez.

Florian defeated Chris Leben on the inaugural season of The Ultimate Fighter reality show, but succumbed in the finale against Diego Sanchez. He has competed on two occasions for the UFC Lightweight Championship and once for the UFC Featherweight Championship, but came up short against Sean Sherk, B.J. Penn, and José Aldo respectively. Recognized as one of the elite competitors during his tenures in the Ultimate Fighting Championship, Florian is considered one of the best mixed martial artists never to have won a UFC Championship.

Early life
Florian is one of six children born to Peruvian parents: Agustin, a thoracic surgeon, and Ines Florian; however, none of his grandparents are from Peru, his ancestry includes: Spanish, Italian, German, French and Armenian. Florian was born in Westwood, Massachusetts and grew up in neighboring Dover, Massachusetts where he was a standout soccer player for Dover-Sherborn Regional High School. He attended Boston College where he played for the varsity soccer team (NCAA Division 1). He also holds dual citizenship in the United States and Peru.

After college, his interests turned towards mixed martial arts and he earned a black belt in Brazilian Jiu-Jitsu from Prof. Roberto Maia of Boston Brazilian Jiu-Jitsu (Boston Brazilian Jiu-Jitsu, formerly Gracie Barra Boston). Florian worked as a translator, reworking financial documents into various foreign languages and planned on doing that for a few years before applying to law school. However, a near-death experience in Brazil inspired him to pursue his passion for mixed martial arts instead.

Mixed martial arts career
Kenny is known for his elbow strikes, which Joe Rogan describes as "razor sharp".

Florian made his MMA debut in January 2003 at Mass Destruction 10, defeating Jason Giroux via TKO 3:23 into the first round. Florian made another appearance in the Mass Destruction Promotion at MD – 15 and scored a victory over Bobby McAndrews by submission (kimura). Following those victories, Kenny suffered his first loss to UFC regular Drew Fickett via decision at Combat Zone 7 – Gravel Pit on July 10, 2004. This is the fight that got Kenny on the Ultimate Fighter as Dana White was at the show scouting Fickett for the show but he was so impressed with Kenny that he offered him, not Fickett, the spot on the show.

The Ultimate Fighter
Kenny went on to compete on the first season of The Ultimate Fighter as a middleweight. He made it to the finals by beating Chris Leben via cut stoppage, before losing at the finale in the first round to Diego Sanchez due to strikes.

Ultimate Fighting Championship
Following his loss to Sanchez, Florian returned at the first UFC Ultimate Fight Night to defeat fellow TUF 1 competitor Alex Karalexis by delivering a vicious cut across the nose with a right elbow.  Karalexis was arguably winning the fight up until the cut.  Florian famously danced and cheered immediately after the strike landed and the cut opened up. Picking up momentum, Kenny went on to face Muay Thai competitor Kit Cope, winning with a rear naked choke submission early in round 2. Florian earned a title shot after defeating Canadian TKO Major League MMA Lightweight champion Sam Stout at The Ultimate Fighter 3 Finale; Florian won in the first round by rear naked choke.

On October 14, 2006, Florian fought Sean Sherk for the UFC Lightweight championship title at UFC 64: Unstoppable and lost via unanimous decision. Sherk completely dominated the fight despite being cut severely by one of Florian's elbows. The judges scored it 50–45 and 49–46 twice for Sherk. In doing so, Sherk became the new UFC lightweight champion.

On April 5, 2007 at UFC Fight Night 9, Florian defeated Japanese fighter Dokonjonosuke Mishima via rear naked choke submission. Florian managed to break free of an excruciating knee-bar attempt made by Mishima late in the fight.

On July 7, 2007 at UFC 73, he fought and defeated UFC newcomer Alvin Robinson via submission due to strikes in the first round. Florian tripped Robinson to the mat before moving to side-control. Florian then transitioned into mount before pounding away until Robinson tapped due to strikes.

In his next fight, Florian managed to get another win via submission due to a rear naked choke against Din Thomas at UFC Fight Night 11. Thomas injured his knee while attempting a takedown during the bout. Thomas was originally slated to face off against Spencer Fisher, but Fisher had to pull out due to a staph infection. Florian took his place.

On April 2, 2008 Florian defeated Joe Lauzon at UFC Fight Night 13 by TKO due to strikes from mount early in the second round to secure his spot among the UFC's top lightweight contenders. The first round went back and forth as Kenny landed a vicious body kick and Lauzon looked for knee bars and heel hooks. Florian finished the round with some hard shots to Joe's head. Florian opened the 2nd round with a takedown and rained down punches on Lauzon from the mount position. Lauzon attempted another heel hook but Florian continued to strike which resulted in Herb Dean stopping the fight.

At UFC 87 on August 9, 2008 Florian defeated Roger Huerta by unanimous decision. By winning, Florian ended Huerta's 17-fight win streak. All three judges scored the bout 30–27 for Florian.

At UFC 91 on November 15, 2008, Florian defeated Joe Stevenson by rear naked choke submission in the first round. Florian executed a takedown before mounting Stevenson and transitioning to a position to finish him with the choke.

Second title opportunity
With the win Florian established himself as the #1 contender for the Lightweight Championship. Florian said "I want B.J.'s belt. B.J., you're one of the best fighters out there. I'm here to test myself. I think you're a great fighter, someone I look up to. I consider you a master. It's time to kill that master." Florian faced off against Penn at the UFC 101 Main Event for the title. During the fight, Florian repeatedly pushed Penn against the fence and attempted to take him down but was never successful. During the 4th round Penn took him down and mounted him. Penn eventually took his back and locked up a rear naked choke, submitting Florian and defending his title.  Florian was visibly crying as he left the octagon after his loss to Penn.

Florian fought Clay Guida on December 12, 2009 at UFC 107. During the second round, Florian caught Guida with a right hand on the chin that dropped Guida. He followed up with a short flurry and finished the fight via rear naked choke at 2:19.

He has expressed interest in getting a rematch with Diego Sanchez. On an episode of MMA Live (before the Penn loss) he said that his loss to Sanchez is the one he would most like to avenge. Sanchez has expressed similar interest as have many fans, though this looks to be unlikely as Sanchez has moved back to the Welterweight division.

Florian defeated former Pride Lightweight Champion Takanori Gomi at UFC Fight Night 21 via rear naked choke in the third round. He won the first two rounds decisively with superior striking, utilizing multiple jabs. Florian eventually took Gomi down in the third round and submitted him shortly after. Florian also won his first Submission of the Night bonus.

Florian suffered a staph infection in his knee just weeks after his win over Gomi and was admitted to hospital for minor surgery.

Florian faced Gray Maynard on August 28, 2010 at UFC 118. Dana White announced the winner of the fight would receive a shot at the UFC Lightweight Championship. Although striking very well throughout the fight, he was taken down at will and lost via unanimous decision.

Florian was expected to face Evan Dunham at UFC 126, but the bout was then expected to headline UFC Fight Night 23 on January 22, 2011. However, Florian had to pull out of the bout due to knee injury on December 6, 2010. Melvin Guillard defeated Dunham as Kenny's replacement.

Featherweight-Third Title Opportunity
On February 7, 2011 it was announced that Florian would be moving down to featherweight. He made his Featherweight debut with a unanimous decision victory over Diego Nunes on June 11, 2011 at UFC 131, with the judges' scorecards being (29–28, 29–28, and 30–27).  Dana White said on MMA Live if Kenny wins this fight he'll most likely get a title shot. 
Florian was given the title shot against José Aldo for the UFC Featherweight Championship on October 8, 2011 at UFC 136 and was defeated by unanimous decision.

Retirement
Following his loss to Aldo, his third loss in a championship fight, Florian initially contemplated retirement from active competition. But in an interview with The Boston Herald., he stated that he still loved the sport tremendously, learning and competing. Kenny then went on to say that he would be making a return to the UFC's lightweight division, but would not fight for at least 6 months so that he can rebuild his body to compete in the higher weight class.
    
Florian has dealt with back problems throughout his career, but suffered a new injury in November 2011 while lifting weights. Having already planned to take six months off to build back to lightweight after losing a featherweight title shot in October 2011, Florian didn’t expect the injury to be a major setback.

After the Aldo bout, Florian had been dealing with tingling and numbness down his right leg and hadn’t been able to train.  After meeting with an orthopedic doctor and a neurologist, both advised the 35-year-old to retire. On  May 31, 2012, Florian announced his retirement during Ultimate Fighter: Live Finale weigh-ins show.

Color commentary career
Florian co-hosted MMA Live, alongside Franklin McNeil and others, for ESPN.com which is shown online and on TV on ESPN. Florian contributed to the show with his MMA experience and perspective as a fighter. Florian now co-hosts "UFC Tonight" on FS1 with Michael Bisping, providing similar analysis and perspectives as he did on MMA Live. Florian was a guest writer for FIGHT!, an MMA magazine, in their April 2009 issue.

On April 19, 2008, Florian filled in for Joe Rogan as the color commentator for UFC 83 and again at UFC Fight Night 19. On June 7, 2009, Kenny Florian would fill in for Frank Mir, whose wife gave birth two days later, as color commentator for WEC 41. Florian also provided color commentary for WEC 49 and the TUF 11 Finale. Florian also took Joe Rogan's place as commentator for UFC 134.

Kenny Florian was briefly suspended by Fox Sports on January 16, 2016 for plagiarism in his preview of UFC Fight Night: Dillashaw vs. Cruz. The offending article lifted significant portions from boxing analyst Lee Wylie's breakdown of Willie Pep.

In 2015, Florian was named as the color commentator for ABC's revival of the robot combat series BattleBots, joined by Fox Sports personality Chris Rose on play-by-play. Florian continued his role on the revival's third season, which moved to Science Channel.

In March 2021, Florian revealed that he had signed an exclusive deal with the Professional Fighters League as a commentator.

Personal life
On Dr Phil, Florian, along with UFC President Dana White and former Light Heavyweight Champion Forrest Griffin, talked to two high school students who participated in classroom "MMA" fights, telling them of the dangers of fighting outside of a sanctioned organization and telling them they should be training in an MMA gym instead. Dr. Phil addressed him as "Kenny Florini".

On June 10, 2010, Keith and Kenny received their second degree on their black belt from Prof. Roberto Maia. Kenny and his brother Keith own and operate Florian Martial Arts Center, a martial arts academy in Brookline, Massachusetts near Coolidge Corner, which teaches Brazilian jiu-jitsu, muay thai, wrestling and mixed martial arts. Instructors at the academy include Kenny Florian, Keith Florian, and Alex Lewis.

In a GQ interview, actor Jonah Hill credits Florian as helping him get comfortable enough to train jiu-jitsu.

Florian is fluent in Spanish.

Championships and awards

Mixed martial arts
Ultimate Fighting Championship
The Ultimate Fighter 1 Middleweight Tournament Runner-up
Fight of the Night (Three times) vs. Sean Sherk, Dokonjonosuke Mishima, Joe Lauzon
Submission of the Night (Two times) vs. Sam Stout, Takanori Gomi

Brazilian Jiu Jitsu
Pan-American Championship
Pan-American Jiu-Jitsu Championships 2003 Brown Middle - 3rd Place
North American Grappling Association
NAGA BJJ Superfight Champion
NAGA Advanced Gi Open Champion
NAGA Advanced Gi Middleweight Champion
NAGA North Eastern Grappling Championships – Pro Lightweight – 3rd Place
ADCC World Championship
2002 Abu Dhabi US Trials
Grapplers Quest
Grapplers Quest Hall of Fame
Grapplers Quest Superfight Champion
Grapplers Quest Worlds Superfight Absolute Professional – 3rd place
Grapplers Quest US Nationals Expert Middleweight – 3rd place
Copa Atlantica
2002 Copa Atlantica Brown Belt Champion

Mixed martial arts record

|-
| Loss
| align=center| 14–6
| José Aldo
| Decision (unanimous)
| UFC 136
| 
| align=center| 5
| align=center| 5:00
| Houston, Texas, United States
| 
|-
| Win
| align=center| 14–5
| Diego Nunes
| Decision (unanimous)
| UFC 131
| 
| align=center| 3
| align=center| 5:00
| Vancouver, British Columbia, Canada
|  
|-
| Loss
| align=center| 13–5
| Gray Maynard
| Decision (unanimous)
| UFC 118
| 
| align=center| 3
| align=center| 5:00
| Boston, Massachusetts, United States
| 
|-
| Win
| align=center| 13–4
| Takanori Gomi
| Submission (rear-naked choke)
| UFC Fight Night: Florian vs. Gomi
| 
| align=center| 3
| align=center| 2:52
| Charlotte, North Carolina, United States
| 
|-
| Win
| align=center| 12–4
| Clay Guida
| Submission (rear-naked choke)
| UFC 107
| 
| align=center| 2
| align=center| 2:19
| Memphis, Tennessee, United States
| 
|-
| Loss
| align=center| 11–4
| B.J. Penn
| Submission (rear-naked choke)
| UFC 101
| 
| align=center| 4
| align=center| 3:54
| Philadelphia, Pennsylvania, United States
| 
|-
| Win
| align=center| 11–3
| Joe Stevenson
| Submission (rear-naked choke)
| UFC 91
| 
| align=center| 1
| align=center| 4:03
| Las Vegas, Nevada, United States
| 
|-
| Win
| align=center| 10–3
| Roger Huerta
| Decision (unanimous)
| UFC 87
| 
| align=center| 3
| align=center| 5:00
| Minneapolis, Minnesota, United States
| 
|-
| Win
| align=center| 9–3
| Joe Lauzon
| TKO (punches and elbows)
| UFC Fight Night: Florian vs. Lauzon
| 
| align=center| 2
| align=center| 3:28
| Broomfield, Colorado, United States
| 
|-
| Win
| align=center| 8–3
| Din Thomas
| Submission (rear-naked choke)
| UFC Fight Night: Thomas vs. Florian
| 
| align=center| 1
| align=center| 4:31
| Las Vegas, Nevada, United States
|
|-
| Win
| align=center| 7–3
| Alvin Robinson
| TKO (submission to punches)
| UFC 73
| 
| align=center| 1
| align=center| 4:30
| Sacramento, California, United States
| 
|-
| Win
| align=center| 6–3
| Dokonjonosuke Mishima
| Submission (rear-naked choke)
| UFC Fight Night: Stevenson vs. Guillard
| 
| align=center| 3
| align=center| 3:57
| Las Vegas, Nevada, United States
| 
|-
| Loss
| align=center| 5–3
| Sean Sherk
| Decision (unanimous)
| UFC 64
| 
| align=center| 5
| align=center| 5:00
| Las Vegas, Nevada, United States
| 
|-
| Win
| align=center| 5–2
| Sam Stout
| Submission (rear-naked choke)
| The Ultimate Fighter 3 Finale
| 
| align=center| 1
| align=center| 1:46
| Las Vegas, Nevada, United States
| 
|-
| Win
| align=center| 4–2
| Kit Cope
| Submission (rear-naked choke)
| The Ultimate Fighter 2 Finale
| 
| align=center| 2
| align=center| 0:37
| Las Vegas, Nevada, United States
| 
|-
| Win
| align=center| 3–2
| Alex Karalexis
| TKO (doctor stoppage)
| UFC Ultimate Fight Night
| 
| align=center| 2
| align=center| 2:52
| Las Vegas, Nevada, United States
| 
|-
| Loss
| align=center| 2–2
| Diego Sanchez
| TKO (punches)
| The Ultimate Fighter 1 Finale
| 
| align=center| 1
| align=center| 2:49
| Las Vegas, Nevada, United States
| 
|-
| Loss
| align=center| 2–1
| Drew Fickett
| Decision (split)
| Combat Zone 7: Gravel Pit
| 
| align=center| 3
| align=center| 5:00
| Revere, Massachusetts, United States
| 
|-
| Win
| align=center| 2–0
| Bobby McAndrews
| Submission (kimura)
| Mass Destruction 15
| 
| align=center| 1
| align=center| 1:57
| Boston, Massachusetts, United States
| 
|-
| Win
| align=center| 1–0
| Jason Giroux
| KO (punch)
| Mass Destruction 10
| 
| align=center| 1
| align=center| 3:23
| Taunton, Massachusetts, United States
|

References

External links

 Official UFC Profile
 Official Kenny Florian Web Site
 Kenny Florian on Twitter
 
 Florian Martial Arts Center Web Site
 Kenny Florian Quotes
 Anik-Florian Podcast

Living people
1976 births
American male mixed martial artists
Citizens of Peru through descent
Peruvian male mixed martial artists
Mixed martial artists from Massachusetts
Featherweight mixed martial artists
Lightweight mixed martial artists
Welterweight mixed martial artists
Middleweight mixed martial artists
Mixed martial artists utilizing Muay Thai
Mixed martial artists utilizing Brazilian jiu-jitsu
Mixed martial arts broadcasters
Ultimate Fighting Championship male fighters
American practitioners of Brazilian jiu-jitsu
People awarded a black belt in Brazilian jiu-jitsu
American Muay Thai practitioners
American sportspeople of Peruvian descent
People from Dover, Massachusetts
Boston College Eagles men's soccer players
Association footballers not categorized by position
Fox Sports 1 people
Association football players not categorized by nationality